Douglas Rosa Tardin (born 8 January  1992) is a Brazilian footballer who currently plays as a forward for Thai League 2 side Suphanburi. In 2018, he played for Vietnamese V.League 1 side Quảng Nam.

References 

1992 births
Living people
Brazilian footballers
Association football forwards
V.League 1 players
Quang Nam FC players
Brazilian expatriate footballers
Expatriate footballers in Vietnam
Expatriate footballers in Cambodia
Brazilian expatriate sportspeople in Cambodia